Drouhard's shrew tenrec  (Microgale drouhardi), also known as the striped shrew tenrec, is a species of mammal in the family Tenrecidae. It is endemic to Madagascar. Its natural habitats are subtropical and tropical moist lowland and montane forests.

References

Afrosoricida
Mammals of Madagascar
Mammals described in 1934
Taxonomy articles created by Polbot